The Roman Catholic Territorial Prelature of Cafayate is in Argentina and is a suffragan of the Archdiocese of Salta.

History
On 8 September 1969, Pope Paul VI established the Territorial Prelature of Cafayate from territory taken from the Diocese of Catamarca and the Archdiocese of Salta.

Ordinaries
Diego Gutiérrez Pedraza, O.S.A. (1973–1990)
Cipriano García Fernández, O.S.A. (1991–2007) 
Mariano Moreno Garcia, O.S.A. (2007–2014)
José Demetrio Jiménez Sánchez-Mariscal, O.S.A. (2014–2019)
Darío Rubén Quintana Muñiz, O.A.R. (2022–present)

External links and references

Roman Catholic dioceses in Argentina
Roman Catholic Ecclesiastical Province of Salta
Territorial prelatures
Christian organizations established in 1969